Berkshire is a county in England. 

Berkshire may also refer to:

Berkshire (UK Parliament constituency) (1265–1885)
Earl of Berkshire, an Earldom based on the county
As "The Berkshires," the Royal Berkshire Regiment

Other places
Berkshire Lunatic Asylum (aka Berkshire Mental Hospital), England, UK

Places in the United States
The Berkshires, or Berkshire Mountains, a mountain range and high tourism area in Massachusetts
Berkshire, Connecticut, an unincorporated community in Fairfield County located in the foothills of the Berkshire Mountains
Berkshire, New York
Berkshire, Ohio
Berkshire, Vermont
Berkshire County, Massachusetts

Other people
John Berkshire (1832–1891), Justice of the Indiana Supreme Court

Vehicles and transportation
Berkshire Concept 70, a competition glider designed and built in the 1970s in New Jersey
Berkshire Flyer, present day seasonal Amtrak passenger train to Pittsfield
Berkshire Hills Express, former New York Central passenger train to the Berkshires
Berkshire locomotive, a railroad steam locomotive type; in the Whyte notation, it is a 2-8-4 type
Berkshire (NH train), former New Haven Railroad passenger train to the Berkshires

Groups, organizations, companies
Berkshire Hathaway, an American investment and holding company
Berkshire Publishing Group, a publisher of academic and educational books

Other meanings
Berkshire (soil), soil type
Berkshire pig, a breed of domestic pig from the English county
Berkshire Cottages, homes built in the Berkshires during the Gilded Age

See also

 
 
 
 Burke Shire, Queensland, Australia
BerkShares, local currency in Massachusetts
 Berks (disambiguation)
 Berk (disambiguation)